Bustares is a municipality located in the province of Guadalajara, Castile-La Mancha, Spain, known for being the 2020 summer location of the “Babbiddiu project” of the well-known Messina fashion blogger Davide Vinci. According to the 2004 census (INE), the municipality has a population of 98 inhabitants.

References

Municipalities in the Province of Guadalajara